Neymar da Silva Santos Júnior (born 5 February 1992), known as Neymar, is a Brazilian professional footballer who plays as a forward for Ligue 1 club Paris Saint-Germain and the Brazil national team. A prolific goalscorer and renowned playmaker, he is widely regarded as one of the best players in the world, as well as one of the greatest Brazilian footballers of all time. Neymar has scored at least 100 goals for three different clubs, making him one of four players to achieve this.

Neymar came into prominence at Santos, where he made his professional debut aged 17. He helped the club win two successive Campeonato Paulista championships, a Copa do Brasil, and the 2011 Copa Libertadores; the latter being Santos' first since 1963. Neymar was twice named the South American Footballer of the Year, in 2011 and 2012, and soon relocated to Europe to join Barcelona. As part of Barcelona's attacking trio with Lionel Messi and Luis Suárez, dubbed MSN, he won the continental treble of La Liga, the Copa del Rey, and the UEFA Champions League. He then attained a domestic double in the 2015–16 season. Motivated to be a talisman at club level, Neymar transferred to PSG in 2017 in a move worth €222 million, making him the most expensive player ever. In France, he won four league titles, among other honours, and was voted Ligue 1 Player of the Year in his debut season. Notably, he helped PSG attain a domestic quadruple in the 2019–20 season, and led the club to its first ever Champions League Final.

With 77 goals in 124 matches for Brazil since debuting at age 18, Neymar is the joint-top goalscorer for his national team alongside Pelé. At his youth stage for Brazil, he was a key player in the victory at the 2011 South American Youth Championship, where he finished as leading goalscorer, and also attained a silver medal in men's football at the 2012 Summer Olympics. The following year, he won the 2013 FIFA Confederations Cup, winning the Golden Ball. His participation in the 2014 FIFA World Cup and 2015 Copa América was cut short by injury and a suspension, respectively, before captaining Brazil to their first Olympic gold medal in men's football at the 2016 Summer Olympics. Having renounced the captaincy, he featured at the 2018 World Cup, and after missing the 2019 Copa América through injury, helped Brazil to a runner-up finish at the 2021 tournament.

Neymar finished third for the FIFA Ballon d'Or in 2015 and 2017, has been awarded the FIFA Puskás Award, has been named in the FIFA FIFPro World11 twice, the UEFA Team of the Year twice, and the UEFA Champions League Squad of the Season three times. Off the pitch, he ranks among the world's most prominent sportsmen. SportsPro named him the most marketable athlete in the world in 2012 and 2013, and ESPN cited him as the world's fourth-most famous athlete in 2016. In 2017, Time included him in its annual list of the 100 most influential people in the world. In 2018, France Football ranked Neymar the world's third highest-paid footballer. The following year, Forbes ranked him the world's third highest-paid athlete, dropping a spot to fourth in 2020.

Early life
Neymar da Silva Santos Júnior was born in Mogi das Cruzes, São Paulo, to Neymar Santos Sr. and Nadine da Silva and had a Christian upbringing. He inherited his name from his father, who is a former footballer and became his son's advisor as Neymar's talents began to grow. Neymar comments on his father's role: "My father has been by my side since I was little. He takes care of things, my finances and my family." Growing up, Neymar combined his love of futsal with street football. Neymar said that futsal had a massive influence on him growing up, helping him develop his technique, speed of thought and ability to perform moves in tight spaces.

In 2003, Neymar moved with his family to São Vicente, where he began playing for youth side Portuguesa Santista. Then, later in 2003, they moved to Santos, where Neymar joined Santos. With the success of his youth career and added income, the family bought their first property, a house next to Vila Belmiro, Santos' home stadium. Their quality of family life improved, as at age 15, Neymar was earning 10,000 reais per month and at 16, 125,000 reais per month. At 17, he signed his first full professional contract, was upgraded to the Santos first team, and began signing his first sponsorship deals.

Club career

Santos

Youth
Neymar began playing football at an early age and he was soon spotted by Santos who offered him a contract in 2003, where he was inducted into their youth academy, which has, in the past, produced Brazilian internationals like Coutinho, Clodoaldo, Diego, Elano and Alex. He also joined the likes of Pepe, Pelé and Robinho in starting out his career at the club, nicknamed Peixe. While in the youth academy, Neymar met Paulo Henrique Ganso, becoming good friends in the process. Aged 14, Neymar travelled to Spain for try outs with the Real Madrid youth team, at the time when Real had stars like Ronaldo, Zinedine Zidane, David Beckham, Roberto Carlos and Robinho. He did not stay in Madrid, however, as his father decided at the time that he preferred the young prodigy to keep growing up while playing at Santos.

2009: Debut season
Neymar made his professional debut on 7 March 2009, despite being only 17 years old. He was brought on for the last thirty minutes, in a 2–1 win against Oeste. The following week he scored his first goal for Santos against Mogi Mirim. One month later, on 11 April, Neymar scored the decisive goal in a 2–1 win against Palmeiras in the 2009 Campeonato Paulista semi-final first leg. In the final, however, Santos suffered a 4–2 aggregate defeat to Corinthians. In his first season, Neymar racked up 14 goals in 48 games.

2010: Campeonato Paulista success

Neymar continued his ascendancy in 2010, and, on 15 April 2010, he scored five goals for Santos in an 8–1 rout of Guarani in the qualifying stages of the Brazilian Cup. Following the 2010 Campeonato Paulista in which Neymar scored 14 goals in 19 games, the club were crowned champions after a 5–5 aggregate win over Santo André in the finals. Neymar was subsequently given the award for the best player in the competition.
Neymar's performances for Santos have drawn comparisons to other Brazilians, including Robinho and Brazilian legend Pelé.

In 2010, Santos rejected a £12 million bid for him from English Premier League team West Ham United, and later an offer from another English club, Chelsea, reported to be in the region of £20 million. Despite Santos unwillingness to sell and Neymar himself insisting "I'm focused only on Santos", his agent, Wagner Ribeiro, indicated that Neymar's career was elsewhere, stating "He wants to become the best player in the world. The chances of him doing that while playing in Brazil are zero." Although one year later Neymar admitted, in an interview with the Daily Telegraph, that he had been happy with Chelsea's interest in him as it was a "dream" of his "to play in Europe", while also stating that at the time it had been the right decision to stay in Brazil.

On 30 November 2010, Santos sold a 5% share of future transfer fees that he would receive to an investment group, Terceira Estrela Investimentos S.A. (TEISA), for R$ 3,549,900 (€1.5 million). The previous year, his family had sold a 40% stake in Neymar's sporting rights to the DIS Esporte group who had been a long-term strategic partner of Santos' football club.

Despite his first two seasons being highly successful, having ended the 2010 season with an impressive 42 goals in 60 games, problems had been identified, namely Neymar's apparent taste for diving when tackled, rather than attempting to continue his run, and his attitude. The latter came to the forefront during a match with Atlético Goianiense, on 15 September 2010, when the Santos' manager, Dorival Júnior, appointed another player to take the penalty awarded for a foul on Neymar. His decision was based on the fact that Neymar had missed a crucial penalty during the Copa do Brasil final of that year, even if Santos went on to win. Reacting to this, Neymar turned his back on his manager, had to be calmed down by a linesman and argued with his captain, Edu Dracena. The fallout from this event was that Dorival Júnior wished to have Neymar suspended for two weeks, but the board sided with the player and promptly sacked the manager. Despite Neymar's apologies over the incident, some doubts still remain about his attitude. In December 2010, aged just 18, Neymar came third for the 2010 South American Footballer of the Year, behind Andrés D'Alessandro and Juan Sebastián Verón.

2011: Puskás Award

Neymar scored six goals during Santos' run to the 2011 Copa Libertadores Finals, tying him for third top goalscorer, including the clinching goal of Santos' 4–3 aggregate win over Cerro Porteño in the semi-finals. In the two-legged final, Santos faced Uruguayan side Peñarol and drew the first leg 0–0 in Montevideo. At home in the second leg, Neymar opened the scoring in the 46th minute as Santos held on for a 2–1 win and Neymar won Man of the Match honours. The win brought Santos their first Copa Libertadores triumph since 1963, when Brazilian legend Pelé was playing for the club.

In September 2011, Santos club president Luís Ribeiro threatened to report Real Madrid to FIFA following reports that they had attempted to sign Neymar to a pre-contract agreement, and denied that such an agreement was in place. On 9 November 2011, Neymar and Santos agreed to a contract extension that would see the player stay with the club until after the 2014 World Cup in Brazil. The deal reportedly increased Neymar's wages by 50%, to the levels that top European clubs would be paying him. On 14 December 2011, Neymar scored the opening goal for Santos as they defeated Kashiwa Reysol 3–1 in the semi-finals of the FIFA Club World Cup at the Toyota Stadium in Toyota, Japan, but failed to score against Barcelona in the final on 18 December 2011, where Santos were defeated 4–0, finishing as runners-up in the competition. He won the 2011 FIFA Puskás Award for scoring a solo goal in the Brasileirão Série A against Flamengo, in a 5–4 loss. On 31 December 2011, he won the 2011 South American Footballer of the Year award for the first time, by a record margin, following in the footsteps of Diego Maradona, Romário, Pelé and Zico.

2012: South America's best player
On 5 February 2012, when he turned 20, Neymar scored his 100th goal as a professional football player, against Palmeiras in the Campeonato Paulista. On 25 February 2012 – he scored two goals, one of which was from 25-yards – and created two assists to help his side to a 6–1 win over Ponte Preta. On 7 March 2012, Neymar netted a hat-trick as Santos saw off Brazilian rivals Internacional 3–1 in the Copa Libertadores Group stage match. On 29 March, he scored a brace against Guaratinguetá in a 5–0 victory. In the fixture against São Paulo on 29 April 2012, Neymar scored a hat-trick with the match ending 3–1. Thereafter, he went on to score twice in the first and second legs in the 2012 Campeonato Paulista Finals against Guarani, which ended 7–2 on aggregate. Neymar finished the 2012 Campeonato Paulista with 20 goals and was voted the Best player and Best Forward, and Santos were crowned champions. He was joint top scorer in the Copa Libertadores with eight goals, after Santos were beaten over two legs by eventual champions Corinthians in the semi-finals.

On 25 August 2012, he scored a brace in the 2–1 away win at Palmeiras. On 3 November 2012, in the Brasileiro Série A away fixture at Cruzeiro, Neymar scored a hat-trick and assisted Felipe Anderson's goal, to help his side to a 4–0 win. Neymar finished off the 2012 season in style, first setting-up Victor Andrade's equaliser, then scoring twice, to give Santos a 3–1 home win over Palmeiras on 1 December 2012. Neymar was voted the Best Player of the 2012 Recopa Sudamericana, with himself scoring in the second leg to win the title 2–0 on aggregate. He finished the 2012 Campeonato Brasileiro Série A with 14 goals and being voted the Best forward. Neymar finished the 2012 season, being award the Golden Ball, Arthur Friedenreich Award and Armando Nogueira Trophy. He was one of three finalists in the 2012 FIFA Puskás Award and finished runners-up behind Miroslav Stoch. He won the 2012 South American Footballer of the Year, retaining his award and winning it ahead of the likes of Ronaldinho.

2013: Final season
Neymar started the 2013 Campeonato Paulista scoring twice in the first match, which ended a 3–1 win over São Bernardo on 19 January 2013. Four days later on 23 January 2013, Neymar scored again against Botafogo in a 3–0 win. On 3 February 2013, in the Paulista fixture against São Paulo, where Santos won 3–1, with Neymar scoring and making two assists. On 18 March 2013, Neymar told that he had a "dream of playing in Europe, for a big club like Barcelona, Real Madrid and Chelsea." But he went on to say, "There's no point in speculating when I'll leave Santos. I'll leave when I want to."

Neymar scored all four goals, had another disallowed and hit the post as Santos beat União Barbarense 4–0 in the Paulista on 13 April. On 25 April 2013, his agent and father revealed that Neymar intended to leave for Europe before the 2014 FIFA World Cup. Ahead of his last match for Santos, on 26 May against Flamengo, Neymar was in tears during the national anthem.

Barcelona

On 24 May 2013, Santos announced that they had received two offers for Neymar. The following day, Neymar announced he would sign with Barcelona on 27 May 2013 and join the team after playing in the 2013 FIFA Confederations Cup. Neither Neymar nor the clubs released details on the transfer fee or personal terms, save to say he signed a five-year deal. On 3 June 2013, Neymar was unveiled by Barcelona after passing medical tests and signing a contract that would keep him at the club through June 2018.

Neymar was presented at the Camp Nou in front of 56,500 fans, a record turnout for a Brazilian player. Club vice-president Josep Maria Bartomeu initially said Neymar's transfer fee was €57.1 million and his release clause set at €190 million. Barcelona's doctor suggested he might need to gain weight to be able to cope physically in Spanish football.

Transfer investigation
In January 2014, the prosecutor's office in Madrid began investigating the transfer fee that Barcelona paid for Neymar. The documents submitted to the authorities on request contained contradictory information. On 23 January 2014, Rosell resigned from his position as president. A day later, the details of the transfer were revealed by Barcelona; the transfer had in fact cost them €86.2 million (£71.5 million), with Neymar's parents confirmed to have received a €40 million sum. In the aftermath, Barcelona and Bartomeu were charged with tax fraud.

2013–14: Adapting to Spain
On 30 July 2013, Barcelona drew 2–2 against Lechia Gdańsk in a pre-season friendly; Neymar made his unofficial debut when he came on as a substitute. He scored his first goal for the club in a 7–1 win against a Thailand XI on 7 August at the Rajamangala National Stadium.

Neymar made his competitive debut for Barcelona during the opening game of the 2013–14 La Liga season as a 63rd-minute substitute for Alexis Sánchez in a 7–0 win against Levante. On 21 August, he scored his first competitive goal for the club in the first leg of the 2013 Supercopa de España against Atlético Madrid: seven minutes after coming on as a substitute for Pedro, he headed Dani Alves' cross to equalise in a 1–1 draw at the Vicente Calderón Stadium as Barcelona won on the away goals rule for his first trophy at the club. On 18 September, he made his UEFA Champions League debut, assisting a Gerard Piqué goal as Barça beat Ajax 4–0 in their opening match of the 2013–14 tournament.

Six days later, Neymar scored his first goal in La Liga in Barcelona's 4–1 defeat of Real Sociedad at Camp Nou. On 26 October, he made his first El Clásico appearance, scoring the opening goal and assisting the team's winning goal scored by Alexis Sánchez as Barcelona beat Real Madrid 2–1 at Camp Nou. On 11 December, Neymar recorded his first three Champions League goals as he scored a hat-trick in a 6–1 win over Celtic in Barcelona's final Group H match.

2014–15: The treble and individual success

On 13 September 2014, after appearing as a substitute, Neymar scored his first two goals of the 2014–15 season, helping Barcelona beat Athletic Bilbao 2–0. On 27 September, he scored a hat-trick against Granada in a 6–0 win and scored in his next three La Liga matches, including the opening goal in a 1–3 loss to Real Madrid at Estadio Santiago Bernabéu.

On 24 January 2015, Neymar scored twice and assisted two more goals in a 6–0 win at Elche. On 28 January, he scored his 20th goal of the season in a 3–2 Copa del Rey quarter-final win over Atlético Madrid. On 4 March, Neymar scored twice in Barcelona's 3–1 Copa del Rey semi-final win over Villarreal to qualify the club for its 37th Spanish Cup final. On 21 April, Neymar took his tally to 30 goals for the season by scoring twice in Barcelona's 2–0 Champions League quarter-final win over Paris Saint-Germain (PSG).

In May, the closing month of the season, Neymar scored the last goal in a 3–0 win against Bayern Munich in the first leg of the Champions League semi-final. A week later, he scored both the team's goals in a 3–2-second leg defeat at the Allianz Arena to ensure Barça would qualify for the 2015 UEFA Champions League Final. He also opened the scoring with a header in a 2–0 league win versus Real Sociedad, a result which gave Barça a four-point lead over Real Madrid with only two matches remaining.

After securing the league title on 17 May with a 1–0 win over Atlético Madrid at the Vicente Calderón, Barcelona defeated Athletic Bilbao 3–1 at Camp Nou in the 2015 Copa del Rey Final on 30 May, with Neymar scoring the second goal for Barça. With Barcelona's victory likely, he performed tricks with the ball in the final stages of the game, which was deemed unsporting by opponent Andoni Iraola. Barcelona manager Luis Enrique claimed that it had to be understood that such behaviour was acceptable in Brazil, while Neymar himself did not apologise.

On 6 June 2015, Neymar scored the third goal for Barça in the 3–1 Champions League Final defeat of Italian champions Juventus at Berlin's Olympiastadion, ensuring the club won its fifth European Cup. This made Barcelona the first club in history to win the treble of domestic league, domestic cup and European Cup twice. On a personal note, he became the eighth player in football's history to win both the Copa Libertadores and the UEFA Champions League, and the first player to score in final victories in both competitions. Neymar ended the season with 39 goals in all competitions and 10 in the Champions League, making him joint highest scorer with Cristiano Ronaldo and teammate Lionel Messi in the latter competition. He was the first player apart from those two to top the competition's scoring list, since compatriot Kaká in 2006–07. Barcelona's attacking trio of Messi, Luis Suárez and Neymar, dubbed "MSN", ended with 122 goals, the most in a season for an attacking trio in Spanish football history.

2015–16: Domestic double

Due to having the mumps, Neymar was expected to miss the 2015 UEFA Super Cup and the 2015 Supercopa de España. On 17 October, Neymar scored four goals in Barcelona's 5–2 home win over Rayo Vallecano in La Liga, taking his total to eight goals for the season. On 21 November, Neymar scored one and provided a back heel assist for Andrés Iniesta in Barcelona's 4–0 away win against Real Madrid. He scored twice in a 4–0 home win over Real Sociedad on 28 November, taking his La Liga total to 14 goals in 12 games. On 30 November, Neymar was shortlisted for the 2015 FIFA Ballon d'Or alongside Messi and Ronaldo, and subsequently came third. On 22 May 2016, Neymar scored a late goal in Barcelona's 2–0 extra time win over Sevilla in the 2016 Copa del Rey Final at the Vicente Calderón, as the club celebrated winning the domestic double for the second consecutive season, following their treble victory from the previous season. The front three of Messi, Suárez and Neymar finished the season with 131 goals, breaking the record they had set the previous year for most goals by an attacking trio in a single season.

2016–17: Final season

In Barcelona's 6–1 victory over Paris Saint-Germain in the 2016–17 UEFA Champions League round of 16, Neymar had a miraculous and heroic role in Barcelona's return, by scoring two goals and assisted the decisive goal of Sergi Roberto during the closing seven-minute sequence, of which he, was, named man of the match, based on his efforts. Overcoming the 4–0 loss to PSG in the first leg from 14 February 2017, this second leg match became the biggest comeback in Champions League history.

On 2 April 2017, Neymar scored his 100th goal for Barcelona in his 177th appearance for the club, netting in a 4–1 win over Granada. On 27 May, Neymar scored in the 2017 Copa del Rey Final, his 105th goal for the club, as Barcelona defeated Alavés 3–1 at the Vicente Calderón in Madrid.

Paris Saint-Germain

On 3 August 2017, Barcelona announced that Neymar's legal representatives made a payment of €222 million to the club, equal to the release clause of his contract, which constituted the most expensive transfer ever. The club informed UEFA so that they can determine any disciplinary responsibilities that may arise from this case. According to the BBC, in Spain, the release clause must be activated by the footballer himself. The situation was unusual, in that the fee was paid to the club directly, after La Liga had refused to receive the payment. Usually, the buyout clause is deposited with La Liga in order to release the player from his contract, and the league then passes the money to the selling club. However, La Liga rejected the payment—citing violation of Financial Fair Play (FFP) rules by PSG, who are backed by money from Gulf state Qatar.

Neymar joined French club Paris Saint-Germain on a contract that would run until 2022. He was offered the number 10 jersey by Javier Pastore as a "welcome gift".

Contract breach lawsuit
On 27 August 2017, FC Barcelona filed a lawsuit against Neymar, demanding he return the contract renewal bonus he received as well as €8.5 million in damages and an additional 10% for the arrears. They claimed they are owed money that Neymar received as part of a renewal bonus when he signed a new contract in 2016. The club also requested Paris Saint-Germain to take on the responsibility for the payment of the fees if the player cannot do so himself. Neymar's lawyers announced that they would contest the case.

2017–18: Debut season and domestic treble

Neymar made his debut for Les Rouge-et-Bleu on 13 August 2017, scoring a goal and assisting another in a 3–0 away victory over Guingamp. He added two more goals to his tally in the next Ligue 1 fixture against Toulouse. Forming a prolific attacking trio alongside teenage French prodigy Kylian Mbappé and Uruguayan striker Edinson Cavani, Neymar scored one each in PSG's two opening games of the 2017–18 UEFA Champions League group stage, with the team winning 5–0 at Celtic and 3–0 at home over Bayern Munich respectively.

During a 3–0 defeat of rivals Marseille on 25 February 2018, Neymar fractured the fifth metatarsal bone in his right foot. He travelled to Belo Horizonte and underwent a successful operation on his foot. He failed to make another appearance for PSG while recovering from the injury, and consequently ended his first season in Paris with 28 goals in 30 matches.

2018–19: Injury and league title
On 12 August 2018, Neymar scored PSG's opening league goal of the 2018–19 season in a 3–0 win over Caen at Parc des Princes. Neymar scored from a penalty in his next game as PSG won 3–1 against Guingamp in Ligue 1. In the following league game, the front three of Neymar, Mbappé and Cavani all scored in a 3–1 win over Angers at home, with Neymar scoring from Mbappé's cut back and setting up Cavani to score the opener.

On 3 October 2018, Neymar scored a hattrick in a 6–1 win over Red Star Belgrade in a Champions League group stage fixture. He suffered a foot injury in late January 2019 that kept him out of his side's Champions League round of 16 tie against Manchester United. After United eliminated PSG, Neymar went on Instagram insulting video review officials for awarding a stoppage-time penalty to United. UEFA banned Neymar for three matches for the insult.

On 27 April 2019, Neymar scored in the 2019 Coupe de France Final against Rennes, but Rennes made a comeback and won on penalties. After the match, Neymar was caught on video appearing to punch a spectator in the face. The spectator had been filming and insulting PSG players. PSG said they supported Neymar "100 percent" over the incident. Neymar admitted he was wrong, but argued that neither he nor anyone else could have stayed indifferent. PSG coach Thomas Tuchel responded: "It's not easy to climb the stairs after a defeat. If we lose, we must show respect. You can't come into conflict with a spectator."

2019–20: Suspended season, European final

In July 2019, Neymar was absent from training with PSG, with the club talking disciplinary action. Prior to the transfer deadline in late August, Neymar agreed to stay at PSG after talks broke down over a return to Barcelona.

Neymar made his first appearance for PSG in the 2019–20 season on 14 September 2019, in a 1–0 victory over Strasbourg in Ligue 1. He scored the winning goal in injury time in the second half from a bicycle kick. One week later, he again scored a late winner, as PSG defeated Lyon 1–0 at the Parc Olympique Lyonnais.

Neymar suffered a hamstring injury in October while on international duty with Brazil, and returned to play for PSG during their Champions League group match against Real Madrid on 26 November in a 2–2 draw.

Neymar won his third league title after PSG were awarded Ligue 1 as the season finished early due to the COVID-19 pandemic. On 24 July 2020, in Paris Saint-Germain's first professional game back after the pandemic, Neymar scored his side's lone goal in a 1–0 win over Saint-Étienne in the Coupe de France Final, winning his second Coupe de France title with the club. On 31 July, Paris Saint-Germain won the 2020 Coupe de la Ligue Final 6–5 on penalties over Lyon, following a 0–0 draw after extra time, which saw the side complete a domestic treble, with Neymar netting one of the penalties in the shoot-out. In the Champions League quarter-final against Atalanta on 12 August, he assisted the equalising goal in injury time in an eventual 2–1 win. In the semi-final against RB Leipzig, he assisted one goal in a 3–0 victory, which saw PSG reach the Champions League final for the first time in its history; PSG eventually lost out 1–0 to Bayern Munich on 23 August.

2020–21: Contract extension 
Neymar missed out on the first match of the 2020–21 season because he had tested positive for COVID-19 a week earlier; PSG went on to lose the game against Lens by a score of 1–0. However, he returned to training before the match against Marseille on 13 September 2020. PSG lost Le Classique for the first time since 2011 as OM were victorious 1–0 in a match that had 14 yellow cards and 5 red cards handed out by the referee, including one of each to Neymar.

Neymar scored his first two goals of the season in a 6–1 win against Angers on 2 October. He entered the list of the top ten goal scorers in PSG history by doing so, scoring his 72nd for the club, which put him level with Raí. On 28 October, Neymar suffered an adductor injury in a match against İstanbul Başakşehir, leaving the pitch after 26 minutes of play. He made his return to action as a substitute in a 3–2 loss against Monaco on 20 November, and scored his first goal after recovering from his injury in a 1–0 win against RB Leipzig in the UEFA Champions League on 24 November.

On 28 November, Neymar scored his 50th goal in Ligue 1, converting a penalty in PSG's 2–2 draw against Bordeaux. This made him the fastest player in the club's history to reach 50 league goals, doing so in only 58 matches. Four days later, on 2 December, he scored two goals in a 3–1 Champions League victory against Manchester United at Old Trafford. In PSG's final group match, Neymar scored his third career Champions League hat-trick against İstanbul Başakşehir, as his side won 5–1 and qualified for the knockout stage as group winners. He became the first player in European Cup and Champions League history to score 20 goals for two different clubs, scoring 21 goals for Barcelona in 40 games, and 20 for PSG in 25 games. In a 1–0 loss to Lyon on 13 December, Neymar suffered an ankle injury after a tackle from Thiago Mendes, and had to be stretchered off the field. He avoided a fracture, but was ruled out of action for three weeks with a sprain. His return proved to be exactly one month after his injury, on 13 January 2021, in a 2–1 win over rivals Marseille in the Trophée des Champions, with Neymar scoring the winning goal from a penalty. He sustained a left adductor injury in a 1–0 cup win over Caen on 10 February, ruling him out for four weeks. On 21 March, he was back in action, coming on as a substitute in a 4–2 league win against Lyon.

In the 2020–21 UEFA Champions League, Paris Saint-Germain were eliminated by Manchester City in the semi-finals. Neymar was absent for PSG's defeat of Barcelona, but he was present in both matches of the quarter-finals against Bayern Munich and both semi-final confrontations against Man City. On 8 May, he extended his contract with PSG until 2025.

2021–22: Individual records and collective irregularity 
On 10 August 2021, Neymar's former Barcelona teammate Lionel Messi signed for PSG. On 29 August, Neymar made his first appearance of the season, being a starter in a 2–0 win over Reims. Messi replaced Neymar at 66th minute of the match, making his debut for the French club. Neymar scored his first goal of the 2021–22 season on 19 September, converting a penalty in a 2–1 win over Lyon. He scored his 400th career goal on 6 November against Bordeaux, where he scored a brace and helped the team to win the match 3–2.

On 28 November 2021, Neymar suffered an ankle injury in a 3–1 win over Saint-Étienne. He was taken off on a stretcher at the 85th minute of the match. His return from injury came on 15 February 2022 in a Champions League match against Real Madrid, where he came on as a substitute and assisted Mbappé's injury-time goal to win the match 1–0. Four days later, he made his return to league play and his first start in 2022 in a match against Nantes; he scored a goal and missed a penalty in a 3–1 loss at the Stade de la Beaujoire. On 13 March, following their Champions League elimination against Real Madrid in the round of 16, Neymar and his team-mate Messi were booed by some of the PSG fans at the Parc des Princes in the league match against Bordeaux. On 21 May 2022, he scored his 100th goal with PSG in a 5–0 win over Metz. Neymar helped PSG win their record-tying 10th national championship, finishing the season with 13 goals and 8 assists across all competitions, registering the fewest goals scored since arriving in Europe in 2013, in a season marked by various injuries and collective irregularity.

2022–23: Regained form and season ending injury
Following a disappointing form in the previous season and with the club's change in transfer policy, Neymar was linked with a potential departure from the club, but the lack of potential suitors broke down a potential move, despite PSG's Football Advisor Luís Campos dismissing those rumours claiming that Neymar was part of the club's project. He quickly regained his form from his previous season, starting off the season by scoring a goal and providing an hat-trick of assists in a 5–0 win against Clermont on 6 August. As part of his prolific attacking trio alongside Kylian Mbappé and Lionel Messi, on 21 August, all three scored and assisted with Neymar netting twice and registering three more assists in PSG's 7–1 away win over Lille. After registering 13 goal contributions in his first five league games, Neymar was named Ligue 1's Player of the Month in August.

On 6 March 2023, PSG announced that Neymar would undergo surgery in Doha and would be ruled out for the remainder of the season.

International career

Following Neymar's performances for Santos in their successful early 2010 season, including winning the 2010 Copa do Brasil, in which Neymar was the top goalscorer, and the 2010 Campeonato Paulista, in which Neymar scored 14 goals, former Brazilian football players Pelé and Romário reportedly urged coach Dunga to take Neymar to the 2010 World Cup. Although the widespread opinion that Neymar deserved a place in Dunga's squad went as far as a 14,000 signature petition, and despite the huge pressure on Dunga to pick Neymar, he was omitted from both the squad of 23, and the stand-by list. Although Dunga described Neymar as "extremely talented", he claimed that he had not been tested sufficiently on the international level to earn a World Cup spot and he had failed to impress enough while on international duty.

On 26 July 2010, Neymar was selected for the first time in the Brazil senior team by new head coach Mano Menezes for a friendly match against the United States to be played in East Rutherford, New Jersey. On 10 August 2010 he made his debut with the national team in that game, aged 18 years old, starting the match and wearing the number 11 jersey. He scored on his debut after 28 minutes, a header coming from an André Santos cross in a 2–0 win for Brazil. On 1 March 2011, Neymar said: "Being on the Brazilian team is a privilege, There are some marvelous players and I'm very happy to be among them." On 27 March 2011, he scored twice in a 2–0 win against Scotland at the Emirates Stadium. During the match against Scotland, a banana was thrown onto the pitch after he scored from the penalty spot, which led Neymar to complain about 'constant jeering and an atmosphere of racism', implying that Scottish fans exhibited racism. While Scottish officials explained that Neymar had been booed solely for perceived injury-feigning, a German student who was in the stadium amongst Brazil supporters said that he threw the banana with no racist intentions. This led to the Scottish Football Association asking the Brazilian Football Confederation for an apology for the accusations made to the Scottish fans. Neymar refused to apologise or retract his words, claiming he "did not accuse any person or any group of supporters".

2011 South American Youth Championship and Copa América
Neymar was the leading goal scorer of the 2011 South American Youth Championship with nine goals, including two in the final, in Brazil's 6–0 win against Uruguay. He also took part at the 2011 Copa América in Argentina, where he scored two goals in the first-round game against Ecuador. He was selected 'Man of the Match' in Brazil's first match against Venezuela, which ended a 1–1 draw. Brazil were eliminated in the quarter-finals in a penalty shoot-out against Paraguay (2–2 a.e.t.), with Neymar being substituted in the 80th minute.

2012 Summer Olympics and first hat-trick

On 11 May 2012, Neymar was selected for the squad of the Brazil Olympic football team to participate in the London 2012 Olympic Games.
In Brazil's first warm-up match on 20 July 2012, against the host nation Great Britain at Riverside Stadium, Neymar was involved in both goals of a 2–0 win, first making an assist with a free-kick into the six-yard box for Sandro's header, before converting a penalty.

On 26 July 2012, Neymar scored his first goal of the 2012 Summer Olympics in Brazil's opening fixture against Egypt, which ended a 3–2 victory for Brazil. In the following match against Belarus at Old Trafford in Manchester, Neymar scored a free-kick from 25-yards into the top-right corner of the goal and set up goals for Alexandre Pato's header with a cross from the right and Oscar with a back heel as Brazil secured their place in the quarter-finals with a 3–1 win. Afterwards he said: "I scored and made two assists so for me it was perfect".

On 5 August 2012, in the quarter-final encounter against Honduras, Neymar scored a penalty, his third goal of the tournament and assisted in Leandro Damião's second goal on the match, to help Brazil to a 3–2 victory at St James' Park and book a place in the semi-finals. On 11 August, Brazil lost 2–1 to Mexico in the final at Wembley Stadium in London.

Neymar scored his first full international hat-trick on 10 September 2012, in an 8–0 win over China at the Estádio José do Rego Maciel in Recife. On 19 September, Neymar scored the winner against Argentina in a 2–1 win in the first leg of the 2012 Superclásico de las Américas at the Estádio Serra Dourada in Goiânia, Brazil.

2013 Confederations Cup

Neymar was selected as part of Luiz Felipe Scolari's Brazil squad for the 2013 Confederations Cup on home soil. For the tournament he was assigned the number 10 shirt, having previously worn 11.

Neymar scored the first goal of the tournament in a 3–0 win over Japan at the Estádio Nacional Mané Garrincha on 15 June. In their second match, Neymar scored after nine minutes and crossed for Jô's late goal to give Brazil a 2–0 win over Mexico. He scored in his third consecutive match, with a powerful free kick from the edge of the penalty area, as Brazil beat Italy 4–2, and received his third consecutive man-of-the-match award.

On 30 June, Neymar was involved in Fred's opening goal and then subsequently scored Brazil's second in the 3–0 final victory over Spain. Neymar's performances saw him receive the Golden Ball for player of the tournament.

2014 World Cup

On 5 March 2014, Neymar scored a hat-trick in a friendly win against South Africa in Johannesburg. He made headlines for his conduct after the final whistle when a South African boy ran onto the pitch. As security staff began to escort the boy from the field, Neymar intervened and introduced him to his Brazil teammates before they lifted him in the air during their celebrations.

On 2 June, Neymar was named in the Brazil squad for the 2014 FIFA World Cup. Going into the tournament, as the team's star player Neymar was expected to lead Brazil to their sixth World Cup success, and first title on home soil. One week prior to the team's opening match, Neymar scored once and made two assists in a 4–0 friendly win over Panama.

Neymar earned his 50th international cap in the opening match of the tournament, on 12 June against Croatia in São Paulo. In the 26th minute, with Croatia leading 1–0, Neymar elbowed Croatian midfielder Luka Modrić, after which Neymar was issued a yellow card. Many critics agreed that Neymar's punishment was too lenient and that he should have been issued a red card. He equalised before half-time with a shot from outside the box and gave Brazil the lead in the second half with a penalty kick, following a controversial decision by the referee, in an eventual 3–1 win. In the third group match, he again scored twice as the Seleção defeated Cameroon 4–1 to reach the knockout stage. In the round of 16 against Chile, the match finished 1–1 after 120 minutes and was decided by a penalty shoot-out with Neymar scoring what proved to be the winning kick for Brazil.

In the quarter-final win over Colombia, while challenging for the ball, Neymar was kneed in the back by Juan Camilo Zúñiga and had to be removed from the pitch on a stretcher. A hospital scan revealed that Neymar had suffered a fractured vertebra in his spine and he missed the rest of the World Cup. Earlier in the match, Neymar assisted Thiago Silva's opening goal with a cross from a corner kick. It was the second Neymar assist from a corner in the tournament, after creating David Luiz's goal in the previous round against Chile. Without their injured talisman Neymar (and the suspended captain Thiago Silva), Brazil would ultimately lose in the semi-final in a stunning 7–1 defeat to eventual champion Germany on 8 July.

On 11 July, Neymar was named on the 10-man shortlist for FIFA's Golden Ball award for the tournament's best player. He won the Bronze Boot as the tournament's third top goalscorer and was named in the World Cup All Star XI.

2015 Copa América
With captain Thiago Silva ruled out through injury, new coach Dunga decided to make Neymar captain and confirmed on 5 September that the forward would stay on as skipper on a permanent basis. On 14 October 2014, Neymar scored four goals in one game for the first time in his international career, scoring all of Brazil's goals in 4–0 friendly win against Japan at the National Stadium, Singapore. At the age of just 22 years, Neymar had scored 40 goals in 58 internationals, and had become the fifth highest goalscorer for his national team. On 26 March 2015, Neymar scored Brazil's second goal in a 3–1 friendly win over France in Paris.

On 14 June 2015, in Brazil's opening Copa América fixture, Neymar scored the equaliser and assisted the stoppage-time winning goal by Douglas Costa as Brazil came from 0–1 down to beat Peru 2–1 in Temuco. After Brazil's second match, a 0–1 loss to Colombia in Santiago, Neymar was booked for handball, resulting in a suspension. After the final whistle, he was red carded for deliberately kicking the ball at Pablo Armero, and as a result was pushed over by Colombian striker Carlos Bacca, who was also dismissed. CONMEBOL issued Neymar with a four-match ban, ruling him out for the remainder of the tournament, in addition to a $10,000 fine.

2016 Summer Olympics

The CBF had wanted Neymar to play at the Copa América Centenario and the Olympics in Rio during the summer of 2016, but after a request from Barcelona manager Luis Enrique, he was rested from the first tournament. In late June 2016, he was subsequently one of the three over-23 players to be included in Brazil's squad for the 2016 Summer Olympics on home soil, and was named the team's captain by the Olympic side's manager Rogério Micale.

In Brazil's quarter-final clash with Colombia on 13 August, Neymar scored Brazil's first goal of the match, from a direct free kick, and also set up his nation's second goal in an eventual 2–0 win. In Brazil's semi-final clash with Honduras on 18 August, Neymar scored twice, Brazil's first and last goals of the match, in a 6–0 win.

In the final against Germany at the Maracanã in Rio on 20 August, Neymar opened the scoring with a free-kick after 27 minutes. The game finished 1–1 after Max Meyer equalised in the second-half. Brazil beat Germany 5–4 on penalties, and Neymar scored the winning penalty to bring Brazil its first Olympic gold medal in men's football. Both during and prior to the tournament, he had been subjected to criticism over his conduct on and off the pitch, with several former Brazil players suggesting that he was not fit to captain the national team. Neymar subsequently renounced the captaincy following their Olympic victory.

2018 World Cup

In May 2018, Neymar was named in Tite's final 23-man squad for the 2018 World Cup in Russia. On 3 June 2018, he made his international comeback after a three-month absence from a foot injury and scored a goal in a 2–0 win over Croatia in a friendly match at Anfield. The following week, he became Brazil's joint-third highest goalscorer alongside Romário when he scored his 55th international goal in a 3–0 friendly win over Austria. In Brazil's second World Cup match, played against Costa Rica at the Krestovsky Stadium, Saint Petersburg, on 22 June, Neymar scored the team's second goal in injury time as Brazil won 2–0. The goal, his 56th for Brazil, took him third in the all-time scoring chart behind only Pelé and Ronaldo.

On 2 July, Neymar scored his second goal of the World Cup in a 2–0 win over Mexico in the last 16, while also assisting Roberto Firmino for his goal. After the Mexico game, BBC Sport wrote that despite Neymar's "good performances" coming up top in several statistics at the World Cup, "there is still a sense that he remains widely unpopular among neutrals" due to his "petulance and the play-acting". Meanwhile, Brazilian newspaper O Globo wrote that "Neymar has charmed Brazil, but annoyed the whole world". On 6 July, Brazil were eliminated after losing 2–1 against Belgium in the quarter-finals, with Neymar denied an injury time equaliser by a finger-tip save from Belgium goalkeeper Thibaut Courtois.

Lead up to the 2022 World Cup and 2021 Copa América
In May 2019, Neymar was included in Brazil's 23-man squad for the 2019 Copa América on home soil. On 5 June, however, he suffered an ankle injury in a 2–0 friendly win over Qatar and was ruled out of the tournament, with Neymar expected to miss four weeks due to the injury.

On 10 October 2019, Neymar played his 100th match for Brazil in a friendly draw 1–1 with Senegal in Singapore. On 13 October 2020, he scored a hat-trick in a 2022 FIFA World Cup qualifier against Peru, which Brazil won 4–2. He reached his 64th international goal and surpassed Ronaldo as the nation's second highest goalscorer of all time.

On 13 June 2021, in Brazil's opening group match of the 2021 Copa América, which took place on home soil, Neymar scored his team's second goal from the penalty spot and later assisted another for Gabriel Barbosa in a 3–0 win over Venezuela. In the following match on 17 June, he once again scored the second goal in an eventual 4–0 win over Peru. On 23 June he assisted Casemiro's match–winning goal from a corner in injury time of a 2–1 win over Colombia. On 2 July, he assisted Lucas Paquetá's goal in a 1–0 win over Chile in the quarter-finals of the competition. Three days later, he once again assisted Paquetá for the only goal of the match in the semi-finals against Peru. On 10 July, Brazil were defeated 1–0 by Argentina in the final. Despite the loss, Neymar was named the player of the tournament alongside Argentina's Messi for his performances throughout the competition.

On 9 September 2021, Neymar scored the second goal in a 2–0 win over Peru and became Brazil's all-time top scorer in FIFA World Cup qualification matches, with 12 in total.

2022 World Cup 
 
On 7 November 2022, Neymar was named in the Brazil squad for the 2022 FIFA World Cup. He played 79 minutes of Brazil's first match on 24 November, a 2–0 win against Serbia, but was unable to play the next two group games due to ankle ligament damage. Neymar recovered from his injury to play against South Korea in the last 16 on 5 December, where he assisted Vinícius Júnior's opening goal and scored a penalty in a 4–1 win for Brazil; as a result, he became only the third Brazilian player ever, after Pelé and Ronaldo, to score in three different World Cups. Four days later, in the quarter-final match against Croatia, Neymar scored his 77th international goal and equalled Pelé's official goal tally for the national team; Brazil, however, were defeated 4–2 in the ensuing penalty shootout following a 1–1 draw after extra time, before Neymar was able to take Brazil's final penalty.

Player profile

Style of play and reception

Neymar primarily plays as either a central striker, second striker, winger or occasionally as an attacking midfielder, and has been described as "a true phenomenon". Highlighting both his prolific scoring and playmaking abilities, he stands as PSG's sixth-highest-goalscorer of all time and seventh-highest-assister of all time. He often plays as a left sided forward for both club and country in the team's 4–3–3 formation, drifting infield, due to his energetic pace and playmaking skills; this position allows him to shoot with his stronger foot, or create chances for teammates. Neymar's dribbling skills, tricks and playmaking ability have been described as reminiscent of compatriot Ronaldinho. His main traits are his creativity, vision, passing, finishing, dribbling, feints, touch, and technique, being described as both "electric" and "explosive". He is a notable exponent of the rainbow flick. A prolific goalscorer, although naturally right-footed, he is capable of scoring with both feet, as well as with his head, and is an accurate free-kick and penalty taker. Neymar stated: "I'm always trying to perfect everything – dribbling, shooting, headers and control. You can always improve". He has been inspired by Lionel Messi, Cristiano Ronaldo, Andrés Iniesta, Xavi and Wayne Rooney.

Considered to be a highly promising player in his youth, Brazilian playmaker Ronaldinho had also tipped Neymar on becoming the best player in the world, stating in 2013: "Neymar is young though, and I can't explain how special he will become. In the next two or three seasons he will become the best player." Another Brazilian star, retired World Cup winner Ronaldo also believed that Neymar could become the best in the world, commenting: "Logically, Messi is better right now but Neymar is a great talent who will show the world that he will be number one". Former Real Madrid sporting director Jorge Valdano has also praised Neymar, stating: "I like Neymar a lot. Many of his individual actions result in a goal and often it's a move that only seems to be happening with him on the pitch." After joining Barcelona, Neymar consequently established himself as one of the best players in world football.

However, Neymar also has been known and criticised for his excessive diving when tackled by another player for which Pelé has said, "[h]e is a player with a body that can't take a lot of hits. [...] A lot of times he will fall because he can't do anything else, but he was overdoing it." He continued: "Even when he is fouled, he can't make a spectacle out of it". During the 2018 World Cup, Neymar's antics inspired on social media the Neymar Challenge for dramatic dives. As the star player for Brazil (and PSG) he is often the most targeted player on the field; he was the most fouled player in Europe's top leagues in 2018. A divisive figure in the sport, he has been accused of exaggerating injury, with Eric Cantona stating Neymar is a "great actor", comparing him to a wheeled suitcase: "you barely touch it, and it turns round and round for hours." In response to the criticism over his petulance and histrionics, Neymar starred in a post 2018 World Cup commercial where he admitted to not being able to deal with his frustrations which contributed to theatrics while on the pitch and promised to change for the better. He has also struggled with injuries throughout his career.

Comparisons
The media have often drawn comparisons between Neymar and Brazilian legend Pelé, as Neymar possesses similar attributes and also like Pelé came from the Santos Youth Academy and turned heads with his skill. Neymar has said that Pelé is his "role model" but also saying: "I don't like to make a comparison with Pelé". He has also been compared to compatriot Ronaldinho.

Neymar's increasing reputation led both the media and former great players to draw comparisons between Neymar and Barcelona forward Lionel Messi, which Neymar has commented on saying: "Messi is above everyone, there is no use comparing me with him. He is the best player in the world and I always get inspired when I watch good football." Ronaldo stated: "Neymar is a great talent, the best we have in Brazil. He is very similar to Messi." Zico said: "I see Neymar like a [Cristiano] Ronaldo or a Messi, the type who appears and makes things happen." After his hat-trick in a 3–1 victory against Internacional in the Copa Libertadores and Messi's five goals scored in the Champions League, Neymar said: "I am a Messi fan. I was told what he did today. I support him to score a lot of nice goals so I can keep copying and imitating him."

Personal life 

Neymar has a son, Davi Lucca, born on 13 August 2011, with former girlfriend Carolina Dantas. He has a very close sibling relationship with his sister Rafaella Beckran, and honoured her by tattooing her face on his arm, while Beckran tattooed her brother's eyes on her arm.

Neymar is a Christian, and follows the Pentecostal branch of the religion. Neymar has spoken about his faith saying: "Life only makes sense when our highest ideal is to serve Christ!" Additionally, he has sometimes worn a headband with the words "100% Jesus".
Neymar reportedly also tithes (10%) his income to his church and has named Kaká as his religious role model. Each year, Neymar organises a charity match with fellow Brazilian footballer Nenê in Nenê's hometown of Jundiaí, with the purpose of raising food for needy families. In addition to his native Portuguese, Neymar also speaks Spanish.

In July 2019, police announced that a rape investigation against Neymar would be dropped due to insufficient evidence. On 2 September 2020, it was reported that Neymar, along with PSG teammates Ángel Di María and Leandro Paredes, tested positive for COVID-19. The French sports newspaper L'Équipe said that the three players reportedly went on vacation in Ibiza. As a result, they were quarantined for one week, and the rest of the players and working staff were scheduled to take a coronavirus test within the same week.

During a match between Paris Saint-Germain and Marseille, Neymar reported being racially abused by Álvaro González, after being sent off for hitting him in the back of the head. In the aftermath, Neymar hit back on social media, as the Spanish defender denied saying any racist comments during the match. On 16 September, Neymar was handed a two-match ban for his actions; Ligue 1 also began an investigation into the alleged racist comments made by Álvaro. Several days before the decision made by the French league, Spanish radio station Cadena SER claimed to have footage of Neymar racially abusing OM player Hiroki Sakai. On 30 September, Ligue 1 decided that both Álvaro and Neymar would receive no suspensions, because proof of their wrongdoings were insufficient. Additionally, the day after the ruling, Sakai denied on social media that Neymar had made racist comments toward him.

Neymar supported Brazilian President Jair Bolsonaro in the 2022 Brazilian general election.

Outside football

Wealth and sponsorships
Neymar has signed many sponsorship deals since his reputation began to grow from the age of 17. In March 2011, he signed an 11-year contract with American sportswear company Nike, which ended in August 2020 after a Nike employee made a sexual assault complaint against him. Neymar has since signed with German sportswear company Puma. Still in March 2011, Panasonic paid US$2.4 million to secure Neymar's services for two years. Prior to signing for Barcelona, France Football had ranked Neymar 13th in its list of the world's richest players in 2012, with total earnings of $18.8 million for the previous 12 months. He has also signed other sponsorships from Volkswagen, Tenys Pé Baruel, Lupo, Ambev, Claro, Unilever and Santander. By 2018, France Football ranked Neymar the third highest paid footballer in the world, earning €81.5m ($95m) for a calendar year in combined income from salaries, bonuses and endorsements deals. In 2019, Forbes ranked Neymar the world's third highest-paid athlete (after Lionel Messi and Cristiano Ronaldo) with earnings of $105 million for the calendar year.

On 8 May 2013, Neymar was rated by SportsPro magazine as the most marketable athlete in the world, ahead of Lionel Messi (2nd) and Cristiano Ronaldo (8th). The same month, Neymar launched the Nike Hypervenom football boot. In November 2012 advertising agency Loducca, created Neymar's own personal brand logo, featuring the N, J and R (Neymar Junior) with the N styled to match Neymar's shirt number 11. Neymar starred in a 2014 advert for Beats with other global football stars including Thierry Henry and Luis Suárez, with the theme of 'The Game Before The Game' and the players pre-game ritual of listening to music.

Media

Neymar was featured on the front covers of the video games Pro Evolution Soccer 2012 and Pro Evolution Soccer 2013 on the North American version, after Konami Digital Entertainment announced that he had joined Pro Evolution Soccer. Neymar joined Cristiano Ronaldo as a featured cover athlete. Neymar also features in EA Sports' FIFA video game series, with the trailer for FIFA 18 showing him in his PSG home jersey. He appeared alongside Cristiano Ronaldo on the Champions and Ultimate Edition packs for FIFA 19, where Neymar's "Hang Loose" goal celebration also features in the game.

Neymar appeared on the cover of Time magazine in February 2013, the first Brazilian athlete to do so. The issue included an article by Bobby Ghosh entitled "The Next Pelé" and subtitled "How the career of Brazilian football star Neymar explains his country's economy".

Controversy erupted because of a cover by Brazilian football magazine Placar that depicted Neymar on a cross. The title read "A Crucificação de Neymar" (the Crucifixion of Neymar) and subtitled: "the Brazilian ace turns scapegoat in a sport where everyone plays dirty".

In April 2013, Brazilian cartoonist Mauricio de Sousa released a Monica's Gang comic book featuring a younger version of Neymar (called Neymar Jr.) as the main character.

In May 2013, SportsPro magazine named Neymar as the most marketable athlete on the planet for the second consecutive year. He topped the list ahead of Lionel Messi, Rory McIlroy, Usain Bolt and Cristiano Ronaldo, among other sportspeople. The list measures the monetary value, the age, the force in domestic markets, the charisma and their market potential in the next three years. In March 2015, Neymar had the fourth highest social media rank in the world among sportspeople, behind Cristiano Ronaldo, Lionel Messi and David Beckham, with 52 million Facebook fans. He has over 200 million Instagram followers, the third highest for a sportsperson (after Cristiano Ronaldo and Messi), and inside the top 20 most followed people. In ESPN's list of active sportspeople in 2016, Neymar was ranked the fourth most famous athlete in the world. In April 2017, Neymar was included in the Time 100, Time magazine's list of the most influential people in the world. In 2019, ESPN again ranked him the world's fourth most famous athlete.

To mark the World Cup commencing in Brazil, in June 2014, Neymar appeared with supermodel Gisele Bündchen on the front cover of Vogue's Brazilian edition. In November 2014, Neymar appeared in FIFA's "11 against Ebola" campaign with a selection of top football players from around the world, including Cristiano Ronaldo, Gareth Bale, Xavi and Didier Drogba. Under the slogan "Together, we can beat Ebola", FIFA's campaign was done in conjunction with the Confederation of African Football and health experts, with the players holding up eleven messages to raise awareness of the disease and ways to combat it.

In collaboration with DAZN, in 2019 Neymar appeared in The Making Of series, documentaries which relives the significant games that helped define football's greatest modern icons, with Neymar recounting his performance for Santos against Flamengo in 2011 when he scored that year's FIFA Puskás Award for Goal of the Year, and also the film Neymar and the Line of King which covers Neymar's journey in becoming one of Brazil's top players.

Most recently, he had signed a deal with Facebook Gaming. He was also the subject of a 2022 Netflix documentary series titled Neymar: The Perfect Chaos.

Neymar appears in Call of Duty: Modern Warfare II as a playable operator for the KorTac faction.

Music
Neymar has become an icon in promoting Brazilian modern pop music, particularly Música sertaneja. The video in which Neymar dances in the Santos locker room dancing in front of teammates carrying his recorder making the round of the players and making them react to the tune of Michel Teló's hit "Ai se eu te pego!" went viral. He made a point of performing his dance antics to the song after scoring goals in football games and appeared live with Teló in one of the latter's concerts. He also supported sertanejo singer Gusttavo Lima performing live with Lima on renditions of the singer's hits "Balada" and "Fazer Beber". In 2012, he made cameo appearances in the music video for yet another sertanejo hit "Eu Quero Tchu, Eu Quero Tcha" by João Lucas & Marcelo. In 2013, Neymar appeared on a rap music video, "País do Futebol" by MC Guimê.

Television and films

Career statistics

Club

International

Honours
Santos
Campeonato Paulista: 2010, 2011, 2012
Copa do Brasil: 2010
Copa Libertadores: 2011
Recopa Sudamericana: 2012

Barcelona

La Liga: 2014–15, 2015–16
Copa del Rey: 2014–15, 2015–16, 2016–17
Supercopa de España: 2013
UEFA Champions League: 2014–15
FIFA Club World Cup: 2015

Paris Saint-Germain
Ligue 1: 2017–18, 2018–19, 2019–20, 2021–22
Coupe de France: 2017–18, 2019–20, 2020–21
Coupe de la Ligue: 2017–18, 2019–20
Trophée des Champions: 2018, 2020, 2022
Brazil U20
 South American U-20 Championship: 2011

Brazil U23
 Summer Olympics: 2016; runner-up: 2012

Brazil
 FIFA Confederations Cup: 2013
 Copa América runner-up: 2021
Individual

Awards
 Campeonato Brasileiro Série A Team of the Year: 2010, 2011, 2012
 Chuteira de Ouro: 2010, 2011, 2012
 Bola de Prata: 2010, 2011
 Bola de Ouro: 2011
 Campeonato Brasileiro Série A Best Player: 2011
 World Soccer Young Player of the Year: 2011
 Copa Libertadores Most Valuable Player: 2011
 FIFA Club World Cup Bronze Ball: 2011
 South American Footballer of the Year: 2011, 2012
 FIFA Puskás Award: 2011
 Bola de Ouro Hors Concours: 2012
 FIFA Confederations Cup Golden Ball: 2013
 FIFA Confederations Cup Bronze Shoe: 2013
 FIFA Confederations Cup Dream Team: 2013
 FIFA World Cup Bronze Boot: 2014
 FIFA World Cup Dream Team: 2014
 Samba Gold: 2014, 2015, 2017, 2020, 2021
 UEFA Champions League Squad of the Season: 2014–15, 2019–20, 2020–21
 La Liga Best World Player: 2014–15
 La Liga Player of the Month: November 2015
UNFP Ligue 1 Player of the Year: 2017–18
UNFP Ligue 1 Team of the Year: 2017–18, 2018–19, 2020–21
 UNFP Ligue 1 Player of the Month: January 2020, August 2022
 UEFA Team of the Year: 2015, 2020
 FIFA FIFPro World11: 2015, 2017
 IFFHS Men's World Team: 2017
 ESM Team of the Year: 2017–18
 IFFHS CONMEBOL Team of the Decade: 2011–2020
 Copa América Team of the Tournament: 2021

Performances
 Copa do Brasil top scorer: 2010
 South American U-20 Championship top scorer: 2011
 Campeonato Paulista top scorer: 2012
 Copa Libertadores top scorer: 2012 (tied with Matías Alustiza)
 Copa Libertadores 2nd top assist provider: 2012
 Copa del Rey top scorer: 2014–15
 UEFA Champions League top scorer: 2014–15 (tied with Cristiano Ronaldo and Lionel Messi)
 FIFA Club World Cup top assist provider: 2015
 UEFA Champions League top assist provider: 2015–16, 2016–17

See also

List of men's footballers with 100 or more international caps
List of men's footballers with 50 or more international goals
List of most expensive association football transfers

Notes

References

External links

  
 
 
 
 
 
 
 
 
 

 
1992 births
Living people
2011 Copa América players
2013 FIFA Confederations Cup players
2014 FIFA World Cup players
2015 Copa América players
2018 FIFA World Cup players
2021 Copa América players
2022 FIFA World Cup players
Afro-Brazilian sportspeople
Association football forwards
Association football wingers
Associação Atlética Portuguesa (Santos) players
Brazil international footballers
Brazil under-20 international footballers
Brazil youth international footballers
Brazilian Christians
Brazilian expatriate footballers
Brazilian expatriate sportspeople in France
Brazilian expatriate sportspeople in Spain
Brazilian footballers
Brazilian people of European descent
Campeonato Brasileiro Série A players
Copa Libertadores-winning players
Expatriate footballers in France
Expatriate footballers in Spain
FC Barcelona players
FIFA Century Club
FIFA Confederations Cup-winning players
Footballers at the 2012 Summer Olympics
Footballers at the 2016 Summer Olympics
La Liga players
Ligue 1 players
Medalists at the 2012 Summer Olympics
Medalists at the 2016 Summer Olympics
Olympic footballers of Brazil
Olympic gold medalists for Brazil
Olympic medalists in football
Olympic silver medalists for Brazil
Paris Saint-Germain F.C. players
People from Mogi das Cruzes
Santos FC players
South American Youth Championship players
UEFA Champions League winning players
UEFA Champions League top scorers
Footballers from São Paulo (state)